Hocine Tafer (born 16 March 1955) is a French former professional boxer. As an amateur he competed in the men's light heavyweight event at the 1976 Summer Olympics. In his first fight, he lost to Juan Domingo Suárez of Argentina.

References

External links
 

1955 births
Living people
French male boxers
Olympic boxers of France
Boxers at the 1976 Summer Olympics
Sportspeople from Constantine, Algeria
Light-heavyweight boxers
21st-century Algerian people